Athéna Locatelli (born 16 July 1991) is a French ice hockey player who currently plays with HIFK of the Naisten Liiga and with the French national team.

She represented France at the 2019 IIHF Women's World Championship.

References

External links

Athéna Locatelli profile at Bauer Hockey France (in French)

Living people
1991 births
Sportspeople from Drôme
French women's ice hockey defencemen
HIFK Naiset players
Université de Montréal alumni

French expatriate ice hockey people
Expatriate ice hockey players in Canada
Expatriate ice hockey players in Finland
Montreal Carabins women's ice hockey players